(from Spanish, "shepherd style"), tacos al pastor, or tacos de trompo is a preparation of spit-grilled slices of pork originating in the Central Mexican region of Puebla and Mexico City, although today it is a common menu item found in  throughout Mexico. The method of preparing and cooking  is based on the lamb shawarma brought by Lebanese immigrants to the region.  features a flavor palate that uses traditional Mexican adobada (marinade). It is a popular street food that has spread to the United States. A similar dish also from Puebla that uses a combination of middle eastern spices and indigenous central Mexican ingredients is called .

History
During the 19th century, variations of a vertically grilled meat dish, now known by several names, started to spread throughout the Ottoman Empire. The Lebanese version, shawarma, was brought to Mexico in the late 19th and early 20th centuries by a wave of Lebanese immigrants, mainly Christians such as the Maronites who have no religious dietary restrictions on eating pork. 

In the 1920s in the state of Puebla, lamb meat was replaced by pork. Mexican-born progeny of Lebanese immigrants began opening their various restaurants.
Later, in Mexico City, they began to marinate with adobo, and using corn tortillas, which resulted in the al pastor taco. It is unknown when they began to be prepared as we know it today, however, some agree that it was in the 1960s when they became popular.

Preparation
Guajillo chile, garlic, cumin, clove, bay leaf, and vinegar are common ingredients, with cinnamon, dried Mexican oregano, coriander, and black peppercorns found in many variants. Meat is thinly sliced off the spit with a large knife into a small corn tortilla and served with finely chopped onions, cilantro, and diced pineapple. A wedge of lemon or lime and a salsa are optional condiments. This meat is also a common ingredient in  gringas, alambres, huaraches, tortas, burritos, and pizza.

Varieties

In some places of northern Mexico, such as Nuevo León, Durango and Chihuahua, these are usually called  if served on corn tortillas, and  if they are served with cheese on flour tortillas.

A similar dish is called , which originated in Puebla in the 1930s from Arab-Mexican cuisine.  use shawarma-style meat carved from a spit, but are served in a pita-style bread called . These tacos have been brought by Mexican immigrants to the United States in the past few years and have become popular in cities such as Chicago and Los Angeles, two of the largest Mexican/Mexican-American population centers in the United States.

A chicken version marinated in the  style was brought back to the Middle East in the early 2000s, and sold as "shawarma mexici". It is typically served in the Middle Eastern style, wrapped with garlic mayonnaise, dill pickle, and french fries in a thin flatbread.

See also

 Dürüm
 List of Mexican dishes
 List of spit-roasted foods
 Sandwich
 Street food

References

Lebanese Mexican
Maronite cuisine
Mexican cuisine
Pork
Sandwiches
Spit-cooked foods
Taco
Pork dishes
Mexican pork dishes